Voltes V: Legacy is an upcoming Philippine science fantasy television series to be broadcast by GMA Network. The series is based on the Japanese anime television series Chōdenji Machine Voltes V by Toei Animation and Sunrise. Directed by Mark A. Reyes, it stars Miguel Tanfelix, Radson Flores, Matt Lozano, Raphael Landicho and Ysabel Ortega.

Background
Voltes V Legacy is a live-action television adaptation by GMA Network of the Japanese anime television series Chōdenji Machine Voltes V that was produced by Toei Company and Sunrise. The anime is commonly known in the Philippines as Voltes V. GMA Network acquired the rights to make a live-action adaptation through Telesuccess Productions, Toei's Philippine licensee.

Voltes V was first broadcast in the Philippines on May 5, 1978, on GMA Network with English dubbing. It was banned by then-President Ferdinand Marcos on August 27, 1979, citing "harmful effects on children" with four remaining episodes being unaired. After the 1986 People Power Revolution that resulted to Marcos' removal from office, the anime was reaired on Philippine television in the 1980s to 2010s.

A full-scale trailer was released on January 1, 2023 on the TV network's social media channels and YouTube, and is touted as the network's most expensive production to date.

Cast and characters
Lead cast
 Miguel Tanfelix as Steve Armstrong
 Radson Flores as Mark Gordon
 Matt Lozano as Robert "Big Bert" Armstrong
 Raphael Landicho as "Little Jon" Armstrong
 Ysabel Ortega as Jamie Robinson

Supporting cast
 Martin del Rosario as Zardoz
 Liezel Lopez as Zandra
 Epi Quizon as Zuhl
 Carlo Gonzales as Draco
 Gabby Eigenmann as Commander Robinson
 Neil Ryan Sese as Dr. Hook
 Albert Martinez as Dr. Richard Smith
 Christian Vasquez as Emperor Zambojil (the 124th Boazanian emperor)
 Carlos Siguion Reyna as the 123rd Boazanian emperor
 Ryan Eigenmann
 Chanda Romero
 Nico Antonio as Gen. Ozlack
 Carla Abellana as Mary Ann Collins Armstrong
 Jamie Wilson as Garth
 Dennis Trillo as Hrothgar / Ned Armstrong
 Max Collins as Rosalia
 Kimson Tan
 Migs Villasis
 Dave Duque
 Joaquin Manansala
 Angela Alarcon
 Sophia Senoron
 Julia Pascual
 Crystal Paras
 Elle Villanueva 
 Jamir Zabarte as Thomas
 Jon Lucas

Production
In January 2020, GMA Network hired Riot Inc. for the post-production and visual effects of the series, with approval and supervision from Toei Company. Script, characters and creation of the Boazanian language would undergo review and approval by Toei.

Mark A. Reyes was hired as the director of the television series. Reyes has been attached for eight years, from the pitching and approval of the series. Noel Layon Flores serves as the lead visual designer. Suzette Doctolero is attached as the writer.

Production sets had been made for Camp Big Falcon, the Boazanian Skull Ship and the Boazanian Earth underground base. The costumes took a year to produce, undergoing several revisions. Reyes said that they had to establish a "good marriage within the "classic Voltes V" look and one that’s acceptable nowadays" when it comes to the series' visuals, adding that they deviate from using spandex for the costumes.

Production was delayed due to the COVID-19 pandemic in 2020. Principal photography commenced on May 28, 2021. It briefly halted in August 2021 due to the enhanced community quarantine in National Capital Region caused by the Delta variant.

On January 11, 2022, GMA earned praises from Toei Company, the license owners of the show. Director Mark A. Reyes also shared that GMA Network had received approval from Japan and a commendation letter from 
the original producer of the anime.

Marketing
GMA aired the first teaser on December 31, 2019 before the new year countdown during Kapuso Countdown to 2020.

The second teaser was released on January 14, 2021. A featurette ("One Epic Ride") was released in December 31, 2021.

Series director Mark Reyes, together with cast members Ysabel Ortega, Radson Flores, Raphael Landicho, Matt Lozano and Jamie Wilson, appeared in ToyCon PH 2022 on July 9, 2022. Reyes revealed the show will premiere in 2023.

The third teaser was released on December 24, 2022. The full trailer (dubbed the "mega trailer") aired on January 1, 2023 during Kapuso Countdown to 2023.

Critical response
In Japan, Toei Ltd. featured Voltes V: Legacy on their website after the trailer's release on January 5, 2023. In a press release by the company, the original makers of the mecha anime praised the project and thanked Filipinos for their love of the franchise, noting the huge popularity of Voltes V in the Philippines since it aired in the country in the late 1970s.

The media outlet IGN in Southeast Asia also described Voltes V: Legacy as "the Filipino answer to Power Rangers and Voltron."

Release
The series will premiere on GMA Network in the second quarter of 2023 and will reportedly consist of 80 episodes.

References

External links
 
 

GMA Network original programming
Non-Japanese television series based on Japanese television series
Philippine action television series
Philippine science fiction television series
Philippine television series based on non-Philippine television series
Television productions postponed due to the COVID-19 pandemic
Toei tokusatsu
Upcoming drama television series